The 2013 E3 Harelbeke was the 56th running of the E3 Harelbeke single-day cycling race.

The race was won for the third time by  rider Fabian Cancellara, after he made a solo attack with around  remaining of the race. Second place went to Peter Sagan of the  team, while third place went to the 's Daniel Oss; both of those riders finished 64 seconds behind Cancellara.

Teams
As E3 Harelbeke was a UCI World Tour event, all UCI ProTeams were invited automatically and obligated to send a squad. Originally, eighteen ProTeams were invited to the race, with six other squads given wildcard places, and as such, would have formed the event's 24-team peloton.  subsequently regained their ProTour status after an appeal to the Court of Arbitration for Sport. With  not originally invited to the race, race organisers announced their inclusion to the race, bringing the total number of teams competing to twenty-five. Each of the 25 teams entered eight riders to the race, making up a starting peloton of 200 riders.

The 25 teams that competed in the race were:

Results

References

External links

E3 Harelbeke
E3 Harelbeke
E3 Harelbeke